Secret History of Kangxi is a 2006 Chinese television series produced by You Xiaogang. The series is the fourth instalment in a series of four television series about the history of the early Qing dynasty. It was preceded by Xiaozhuang Mishi (2003), Huang Taizi Mishi (2004) and Taizu Mishi (2005), all of which were also produced by You Xiaogang. The series was renamed to Nalan and Kangxi for release in Hong Kong on ATV.

Cast
 Xia Yu as the Kangxi Emperor
 Hu Jing as Qingge'er
 Wallace Chung as Nalan Xingde
 Wu Qianqian as Empress Dowager Xiaozhuang
 Du Yulu as Oboi
 Chae Rim as Empress Hešeri
 Shi Xiaoqun as Consort Hui
 Shi An as Cao Yin
 Li Fei'er as Princess Duanmin
 William Lee as Fuquan
 Bo Guanjun as Mingju
 Wang Xufeng as Suksaha
 Yu Weifeng as Songgotu
 Di Jianqing as Prince An
 Liu Can as Banbu Ershan
 Li Guohua as Ebilun
 Lei Mu as Mulima
 Zhuang Jin as Sumalagu
 Hu Zhonghu as Liang Jiugong
 Sun Xiuchen as Nanny Ning
 Cai Wenyan as Lady Gui
 Zhao Lianjun as Giyesu
 Bai Qinglin as Lu Rui
 Lu Enhua as Xiao Wan
 Ren Yuqing as Shang Zhixin
 Dong Ziwu as Wu Sangui
 Zhu Xiaochun as Imperial Physician Wang

External links 
  Secret History of Kangxi on Sina.com
  Secret History of Kangxi page on ATV's website

2006 Chinese television series debuts
2006 Chinese television series endings
Asia Television original programming
Television series set in the Qing dynasty
Mandarin-language television shows
Chinese historical television series
Beijing Television original programming